Kararhynchus is an extinct genus of beetles. Two new species, K. gratshevi and K. jurassicus, were described from the middle Late Jurassic epoch of Kazakhstan by A. A. Legalov in 2012.

References

External links 

Prehistoric beetle genera
Late Jurassic insects
Fossils of Kazakhstan
Fossil taxa described in 1994